Epureanu or Iepureanu is a Romanian surname that may refer to:

 Alexandru Epureanu (born 1986), Moldovan footballer
 Manolache Costache Epureanu (1823–1880), Romanian politician
 Serghei Epureanu (born 1976), Moldovan footballer

Surnames of Moldovan origin
Romanian-language surnames
Surnames from nicknames